Nonar is a village in the Tehsil Zafarwal Narowal District of the Punjab province in Pakistan.  Neighbouring settlements include Chida, Lohan, Loter Shareef, Nai Abadi, Musalmaniyan, Tapyala and Domala.

Famous politician in nonar was Sufi Nazar Mohammad MPA  (PP-110 - Sialkot-VI) 

https://www.pap.gov.pk/uploads/previous_members/L-1972-1977.htm

References

 Populated places in Narowal District